Lam Chau was an island in Hong Kong. It was one of the two original islands that made up the site of the current Hong Kong International Airport.

The small island lay to the west of Chek Lap Kok and north of Lantau Island. Like Chek Lap Kok, geologically Lam Chau consisted of granite.

In the 1990s, the island was flattened and joined with Chek Lap Kok to form the airport island by land reclamation. The former island is now part of the southwest side of the airport grounds, located close to the western end of the south runway.

References

 

Islands District